Henry Chapelhow (6 March 1885 – 1960), sometimes known as Bert Chapelow, was an English professional footballer who played as an outside right in the Football League for Manchester City.

Personal life 
In November 1915, during the First World War, Chapelhow enlisted in the Royal Garrison Artillery. He was gassed and admitted to the Croydon War Hospital in April 1918. After his discharge one month later, he was posted to the Royal Artillery Command Depot in Ripon until the Armistice.

Career statistics

References

Footballers from Cumbria
English footballers
Association football outside forwards
English Football League players
British Army personnel of World War I
Royal Garrison Artillery soldiers
Penrith F.C. players
Lancaster City F.C. players
Chorley F.C. players
Manchester City F.C. players
Darlington F.C. players
Brentford F.C. wartime guest players
1885 births
1960 deaths
People from Penrith, Cumbria